Otto Diller Schmidt (August 10, 1884 – February 10, 1963) was a seaman serving in the United States Navy who received the Medal of Honor for bravery.

Biography
On July 21, 1905, one of the 's boilers exploded while it was in port at San Diego, California. For his actions during and following the explosion he received the Medal January 5, 1906.

After his discharge from the Navy, he returned to Blair, Nebraska and was married to Maud Wilcox. In 1917, he moved to Norfolk, Nebraska and in 1922 got a job as a mail carrier there. In the late 1940s, he retired from his job and moved back to Blair, Nebraska. In 1960, he moved to Crowell Memorial home in Blair, where he died three years later in 1963.
 
He died February 10, 1963, in Blair, Nebraska and is buried at Prospect Hill Cemetery in Norfolk, Nebraska.

Legacy
Otto Schmidt's Medal Of Honor resides in the custody of the Norfolk Historical Society. In early 2017, Schmidt's Medal Of Honor was put on display in the Washington County Museum, after an effort to return his medal to the county was spearheaded by two Blair high school students, Ben Zimmerman and Spencer Goodwater.

Medal of Honor citation
Rank and organization: Seaman, U.S. Navy. Born: 10 August 1884, Blair, Nebr. Accredited to: Nebraska. G.O. No.: 13, 5 January 1906.
Citation:

While serving on board the U.S.S. Bennington for extraordinary heroism displayed at the time of the explosion of a boiler of that vessel at San Diego, Calif., 21 July 1905.

See also

List of Medal of Honor recipients during peacetime

References

External links

1884 births
1963 deaths
United States Navy Medal of Honor recipients
United States Navy sailors
People from Blair, Nebraska
Burials in Nebraska
American military personnel of the Spanish–American War
Non-combat recipients of the Medal of Honor
People from Norfolk, Nebraska